Askje is a village in Stavanger municipality in Rogaland county, Norway.  The small, coastal farming and fishing village is located on the southeastern end of the island of Mosterøy. The small village is the site of the Askje Church.

Prior to 2020, the village was part of the old Rennesøy municipality.

References

Villages in Rogaland
Stavanger